"Land of the Silver Birch" is a traditional Canadian folk song that dates from the 1920s. The lyrics are sometimes erroneously attributed to Pauline Johnson, perhaps in confusion with her well-known poem, "The Song My Paddle Sings". It is sometimes sung to keep time while canoeing, and sometimes sung at campfires in a round. It is in Aeolian, or natural minor, but may be sung with a raised sixth, creating a Dorian feel.

Its subject matter is a romanticized vision of nature and the land from the perspective of an Indigenous person. Bonnie Dobson sang this song on her 1972 self-titled album. This song appears in the Paul Gross film Men with Brooms (2002). In 2005, the song was partly re-written by Canadian folk singer Dickson Reid and released on his debut album, Sugar in the Snow. 

Its past popularity with the non-indigenous majority in Canada, particularly as an elementary school choir song, is declining with greater awareness of the impacts of colonization and cultural appropriation. In 2016, a Toronto public school apologized to parents following a performance of the song, describing it as "inappropriate and racist." The music teacher who conducted the choir that performed the song later sued the Toronto District School Board for libel, generating local and national media coverage.

Lyrics
Like most traditional songs the lyrics vary slightly. The following are representative:

verse 1:

Land of the silver birchHome of the beaverWhere still the mighty mooseWanders at will

Refrain:Blue lake and rocky shoreI will return once moreboomdidi boom boom – boomdidi boom boom – boomdidi boom boom boom

High on a rocky ledge I'll build my wigwam  (Alternate version: There where the blue lake lies, I'll set my wigwam)Close to the water's edgeSilent and still

Refrain

My heart grows sick for theeHere in the low landsI will return to theeHills of the north

Refrain

It is related to a similar song "My Paddle's Keen and Bright", written by Margaret Embers McGee (1889–1975) in 1918, which is used to keep time paddling and is frequently intermingled:

My paddle's keen and brightFlashing with silverFollow the wild goose flight (other known colloquial versions of this line exist, including: Follow the pale moonlight, and Follow the waters light.)Dip, dip and swing

Dip, dip and swing her backFlashing with silverSwift as the wild goose fliesDip, dip and swing

Alternative lyrics
The lyrics of this song can be quite different depending on who you talk to and what region of Canada they are from. Some possible variations and additional verses:

Deep in the forestDown in the lowlandsMy heart cries out for theeHills of the North

Swift as a silver fishCanoe of birch barkThy mighty waterwaysCarry me forth

Though I am forced to fleeFar from my homelandI will return to theeHills of the North

High as an eagle soarsOver the mountainsMy spirit rises upFree as a bird

A French version, "Terre du bouleau blanc", was distributed by Orff Canada.

In 1979 the Canadian Cultural Workers' Committee, a musical group associated with the Communist Party of Canada (Marxist-Leninist), released a song on their album 'The Party is the Most Precious Thing' titled 'Death to the Traitors' which takes its melody from Land of the Silver Birch but with new communist lyrics about destroying imperialism and capitalism in Canada and uniting the Canadian working class.

"Silver Birch" in the Scouts and Guiding movement
Since the 1930s, the song has been popular with Scouts and Girl Guides. Its origin is unclear.
It is sung regularly at Canadian Scout and Girl Guide Camps, including Doe Lake, Camp Maple Leaf, Camp Wenonah (co-educational camp) and Camp Wa-Thik-Ane in Quebec's lower laurentians.

The song is also sometimes sung at Boy Scout Camps in the United States, though sometimes "eagle" is sung in place of "beaver". Another variation is sung at the opening and closing campfires at Ma-Ka-Ja-Wan Scout Reservation in Pearson, Wisconsin. Cuyuna Scout Camp of Crosslake, Minnesota uses this song as one of the three it uses to close its Sunday and Friday night campfire programs, as does Camp Babcock-Hovey in Ovid, New York.

The translated Italian version "Terra di Betulla" is likely frequent campfire song for Italian scouts.

Other uses
This song is performed by children in American elementary school plays about the First Thanksgiving to typify Native American lifestyle only using the first verses.

In the 2019 Brotherhood, directed by Richard Bell—based on a true story of tragic canoeing accident in an Ontario, Canada lake at a boys' summer camp, that took eleven lives—the boys' hearty rendition of Land of the Silver Birch as the canoe trip began, is replayed throughout the film in subdued tones, reflecting the survivors' struggle to stay alive in the dark, frigid waters. In 1926, ten boys and a camp counsellor died, when their 30-foot canoe capsized.

See also

Anthems and nationalistic songs of Canada

Notes

Canadian folk songs
Canadian children's songs
Canadian patriotic songs
Traditional children's songs
Sporting songs
Songs about nature
Songs about indigenous peoples
Songs about Canada
Canoeing mass media